Fariman County is in Razavi Khorasan province, Iran. The capital of the county is the city of Fariman. At the 2006 census, the county's population was 86,428 in 20,925 households. The following census in 2011 counted 93,930 people in 25,686 households. At the 2016 census, the county's population was 99,001 in 28,641 households.

Administrative divisions

The population history of Fariman County's administrative divisions over three consecutive censuses is shown in the following table. The latest census shows two districts, five rural districts, and four cities.

References

 

Counties of Razavi Khorasan Province